Central Ibibio is the major dialect cluster of the Cross River branch of Benue–Congo. Efik proper has national status in Nigeria and is the literary standard of the Efik languages, though Ibibio proper has more native speakers.

Varieties
Efik-Ibibio is a dialect cluster spoken by about 15 million people of Akwa Ibom State and Cross River States of Nigeria, making it the fifth largest language cluster in Nigeria after Hausa, Yoruba, Igbo and Fulani.

The major Efik-Ibibio languages are:
 Anaang (3 million speakers, 2018 estimate)
 Ibibio (10 million speakers, including L2 speakers, 2018 estimate)
 Efik (3 million speakers, 2018 estimate. Efik also has about 2 million second-language speakers.)
Minor varieties, according to Williamson and Blench, are:
 Ekit (200,000 speakers), with dialect Etebi
 Efai (7,000 speakers)
 Ibuoro (20,000 speakers), with dialects Ibuoro proper, Ito, Itu Mbon Uzo and Nkari
 Eki (5,000 speakers)
 Idere (5,000 speakers)
 Ukwa (100 speakers)
These arguably constitute a single language, though Ethnologue considers them to be separate.

See also
Eket
Nsibidi
Ekpe
Calabar
Southeastern Nigeria

Notes

References

 
Languages of Nigeria
Ibibio
Lower Cross River languages